J'Nathan Bullock (born June 25, 1987) is an American professional basketball player who last played for the  Rain or Shine Elasto Painters of the Philippine Basketball Association (PBA). He played college basketball at Cleveland State University.

He was signed by the New York Jets of the National Football League as an undrafted free agent in 2009, but did not make the final roster. He has since played basketball in Australia, Belgium, Iceland, Finland, and the Philippines.

Early years
Bullock had played football at Flint Northern High School.

American Football

New York Jets
Although Bullock did not play football in college, he was signed as a tight end by the New York Jets of the National Football League. He was waived by the team on August 16.

Basketball

College career
Bullock played college basketball for four seasons at Cleveland State University, where he earned a Bachelor of Arts from the College of Liberal Arts and Social Sciences.

Professional career

Australia (2010)
In early 2010, Bullock signed with the Geelong Supercats where he averaged 19 points and 7 rebounds per game, helping the club win the SEABL championship.

Belgium (2010)
In June 2010, Bullock signed with Optima Gent of Belgium for the 2010–11 season. In December 2010, he left Optima due to injury.

Iceland (2011–2012)
Bullock signed with Grindavík in the Icelandic Úrvalsdeild for the 2011–12 season. On February 2, 2012, Bullock scored 51 points against ÍR.

He was named the best player of the second half of the season and was instrumental in the team winning the 2012 national championship, and was named as the Playoffs MVP and Foreign Player of the Year.

Finland (2012–2013)
Bullock signed with Kauhajoen Karhu in Finland for the 2012–13 season.

NBA D-League (2013)
On October 31, 2013, he was acquired by the Maine Red Claws. However, he was later waived on November 17.

Philippines (2017)
Bullock played for the Rain or Shine Elasto Painters

South Korea (2017)
After playing for the Elasto Painters, he signed with South Korea's LG Sakers

Return to Iceland (2017)
In the second half of 2017, Bullock signed back in Iceland with Grindavík on December 21 for the rest of the 2017–18 season. In 11 regular season games, he averaged 21.1 points, 8.5 rebounds and 3.0 assists per game, helping Grindavík to the playoffs where it lost in the first round against Tindastóll.

Belgium (2019–Present)
On December 15, 2019, Bullock signed with Basket Waregem of the Belgian Second Division.

References

External links
Cleveland State Vikings basketball bio
New York Jets bio
J'Nathan Bullock at realgm.com
Úrvalsdeild statistics at kki.is

1987 births
Living people
American expatriate basketball people in Australia
American expatriate basketball people in Belgium
American expatriate basketball people in Finland
American expatriate basketball people in Iceland
American expatriate basketball people in Israel
American expatriate basketball people in the Philippines
American football tight ends
American men's basketball players
Basketball players from Flint, Michigan
Cleveland State Vikings men's basketball players
Elitzur Yavne B.C. players
Gent Hawks players
Grindavík men's basketball players
Kauhajoen Karhu players
Maccabi Kiryat Gat B.C. players
Philippine Basketball Association imports
Players of American football from Flint, Michigan
Rain or Shine Elasto Painters players
Small forwards
Tampereen Pyrintö players
Úrvalsdeild karla (basketball) players